A number of steamships have been named Anne Reed, including:
 , a cargo ship in service 1946–49
 , a Hansa A Type cargo ship in service 1950–56

Ship names